Sons of Beaches is the third studio album from Australian rock band Australian Crawl, released in July 1982. It became the band's second #1 in the Australian albums charts (for 5 weeks). The album was recorded in Hawaii with ex-pat Mike Chapman, who had also produced Blondie and The Knack.

Reception
Cash Box magazine said "Recorded in Hawaii with studio mastermind Mike Chapman, the Aussie sextet can boomerang from brooding songs about 'Daughters of the Northern Coast' to a silly bop tune like 'King Sap (and Princess Sag)' with ease."

Track listing
"Runaway Girls" (Guy McDonough)
"Daughters of the Northern Coast" (James Reyne, G McDonough)
"Mid-Life Crisis" (Reyne)
"Shut Down" (William "Bill" McDonough)
"King Sap (and Princess Sag)" (Reyne)
"Letter From Zimbabwe" (Reyne)
"Downhearted" (Sean Higgins, G McDonough, W McDonough)
"Live Now, Pay Later" (Reyne)
"Dianne" (G McDonough)
"Grinning Bellhops" (Reyne)
"Waiting" (Brad Robinson, G McDonough)
"(Not So) Happy Song For Problem Children" (Reyne)

Songwriting credits from Australasian Performing Right Association (APRA).

Charts

Weekly charts

Year-end charts

Certifications and sales

Personnel
Credited to:
 James Reyne – lead vocals, piano
 Simon Binks – lead guitar
 Guy McDonough – co-lead vocals, rhythm guitar
 Bill McDonough – drums, percussion
 Paul Williams – bass guitar
 Brad Robinson – rhythm guitar
 Producer — Mike Chapman

References

Australian Crawl albums
1982 albums
Albums produced by Mike Chapman